West Caldwell Tech is a regional public high school located in West Caldwell, that offers occupational and academic instruction for students in ninth through twelfth grades in Essex County, New Jersey, United States, operating as part of the Essex County Vocational Technical Schools.

As of the 2020–21 school year, the school had an enrollment of 336 students and 35.0 classroom teachers (on an FTE basis), for a student–teacher ratio of 9.6:1. There were 198 students (58.9% of enrollment) eligible for free lunch and 25 (7.4% of students) eligible for reduced-cost lunch.

Awards, recognition and rankings
West Caldwell Tech was named a 2012 National Blue Ribbon School by the United States Department of Education, one of 17 schools in the state of New Jersey and 269 school nationwide to receive the designation. The Department of Education awards the National Blue Ribbon to public and private elementary, middle and high schools for being high performing schools or to schools that show significant improvement in the students' level of achievement. West Caldwell Tech received the designation for being an "Exemplary Improving School."

Schooldigger.com ranked the school as 307th out of 389 public high schools statewide in its 2012 rankings (an increase of 8 positions from the previous ranking) which were based on the combined percentage of students classified as proficient or above proficient on the language arts literacy (64.7%) and mathematics (88.2%) components of the High School Proficiency Assessment (HSPA).

Athletics
The West Caldwell Tech Eagles compete as an independent school with no conference affiliation, under the jurisdiction of the New Jersey State Interscholastic Athletic Association (NJSIAA). With 248 students in grades 10-12, the school was classified by the NJSIAA for the 2019–20 school year as Group I for most athletic competition purposes, which included schools with an enrollment of 75 to 476 students in that grade range.

Administration
The principal is Ayisha Ingram-Robinson.

References

External links 
West Caldwell Tech
Essex County Vocational Technical Schools

Statistical data for the Essex County Vocational Technical Schools, National Center for Education Statistics

West Caldwell, New Jersey
Public high schools in Essex County, New Jersey
Vocational schools in New Jersey